|}
{| class="collapsible collapsed" cellpadding="0" cellspacing="0" style="clear:right; float:right; text-align:center; font-weight:bold;" width="280px"
! colspan="3" style="border:1px solid black; background-color: #77DD77;" | Also Ran

The 2010 Epsom Derby was a horse race which took place at Epsom Downs on Saturday 5 June 2010. It was the 231st running of the Derby and was won by Workforce in a course record time. The winner was ridden by Ryan Moore and trained by Sir Michael Stoute. The pre-race favourite was Jan Vermeer.

Race details
 Sponsor: Investec
 Winner's prize money: £771,504
 Going: Good to firm
 Number of runners: 12
 Winner's time: 2:31.33

Full result

* The distances between the horses are shown in lengths or shorter – nse = nose; shd = short-head; hd = head; nk = neck† Trainers are based in Great Britain unless indicated

Winner's details
Further details of the winner, Workforce:

 Foaled: 2007
 Sire: King's Best; Dam: Soviet Moon 
 Owner: Prince Khalid Abdullah
 Breeder: Juddmonte Farms Ltd
 Rating in 2010 World Thoroughbred Rankings:

Form analysis

Two-year-old races
Notable runs by the 2010 Derby participants as two-year-olds in 2009:

 Jan Vermeer - 1st Critérium International
 Midas Touch - 4th Critérium International
 Al Zir - 3rd Racing Post Trophy
 Coordinated Cut - 10th Racing Post Trophy
 Buzzword - 2nd Richmond Stakes, 2nd Solario Stakes, 1st Prix La Rochette, 3rd Prix Jean-Luc Lagardère, 5th Dewhurst Stakes, 5th Breeders' Cup Juvenile Turf
 Hot Prospect - 6th Silver Tankard Stakes
 Azmeel - 1st Washington Singer Stakes
 Ted Spread - 3rd Zetland Stakes

The road to Epsom
Early-season appearances in 2010 and trial races prior to running in the Derby:

 Workforce – 2nd Dante Stakes
 At First Sight – 2nd Ballysax Stakes, 3rd Derrinstown Stud Derby Trial
 Rewilding – 2nd Prix Noailles, 1st Cocked Hat Stakes
 Jan Vermeer - 1st Gallinule Stakes
 Midas Touch – 1st Derrinstown Stud Derby Trial
 Al Zir - 9th 2,000 Guineas
 Coordinated Cut - 3rd Dante Stakes
 Buzzword - 14th 2,000 Guineas, 4th Poule d'Essai des Poulains
 Hot Prospect - 3rd Lingfield Derby Trial
 Azmeel - 2nd Bet365 Classic Trial, 1st Dee Stakes
 Ted Spread - 1st Chester Vase
 Bullet Train - 1st Lingfield Derby Trial

Subsequent Group 1 wins
Group 1 / Grade I victories after running in the Derby.

 Buzzword – Deutsches Derby (2010)
 Rewilding - Dubai Sheema Classic (2011), Prince of Wales's Stakes (2011)
 Workforce - Prix de l'Arc de Triomphe (2010)

Subsequent breeding careers
Leading progeny of participants in the 2010 Epsom Derby.
Bullet Train (12th) - Exported to America - Shuttled to Australia - Relocated to Ireland - Chapada (3rd Rosehill Guineas 2019)Workforce (1st) - Exported to JapanJan Vermeer (4th) - Exported to MoroccoMidas Touch (5th) - Exported to AmericaBuzzword (8th) - Exported to Italy - Exported to Chile

References

External links
  Racing Post
 Epsom 16:00 – Result: Investec Derby Sporting Life, 5 June 2010

Epsom Derby
 2010
Epsom Derby
Epsom Derby
2010s in Surrey